This list of tallest buildings and structures in Leicester ranks the loftiest buildings in Leicester, United Kingdom by height. In pole position within the city is the 17+ storey Cardinal Telephone Exchange (dating back some 50 years), which rises  (c.  to pinnacle/antennae). As of 2012 it is the United Kingdom's 54th tallest building. If constructed, the approved Westbridge Hotel Tower would reach , therefore becoming the city's tallest building. At  and 22–storeys, the Summit, a student accommodation tower on Eastern Boulevard, is the city's third tallest tower block since its completion in 2013. There are twelve buildings in the city rising  or more.

Tallest completed buildings
 
This is a list of the tallest completed buildings in Leicester.  Heights are approximate and measured to the structural height, which includes architectural elements, but not communications spires or antennae. The items listed are all buildings in Leicester with a height of 40 m (≈125 ft) and over. Heights are above ground level (AGL)

Tallest buildings yet to complete

This is a list of the tallest buildings yet to complete in Leicester (over ≈ 40 m /≈130 ft/ in height) that are under construction, approved, on hold/cancelled or proposed (c.2000–present).

See also
List of tallest buildings in the United Kingdom

External links
  (General Database of Skyscrapers)
  (Specific statistics on British buildings)
  (Diagrams and details of buildings)

References

Buildings and structures in Leicester
Leicester
 
buildings